Ludwig Mayer (16 February 1902 – 1 January 1945) was a German skier. He competed in the military patrol at the 1928 Summer Olympics. He was killed in action during World War II.

References

1902 births
Place of birth missing
1945 deaths
German military patrol (sport) runners
Military patrol competitors at the 1928 Winter Olympics
German military personnel killed in World War II
Missing in action of World War II
Winter Olympics competitors for Germany